The America Zone was one of the two regional zones of the 1948 Davis Cup.

4 teams entered the America Zone, with the winner going on to compete in the Inter-Zonal Final against the winner of the Europe Zone. Australia defeated Mexico in the final, and went on to face Czechoslovakia in the Inter-Zonal Final.

Draw

Semifinals

Cuba vs. Australia

Canada vs. Mexico

Final

Mexico vs. Australia

References

External links
Davis Cup official website

Davis Cup Americas Zone
America Zone
Davis Cup